Emil Aleksandrov Kyulev (June 5, 1957 – October 26, 2005) was a Bulgarian banker, owner of DZI bank. 
Kyulev was born on June 5, 1957 in Sofia, Bulgaria. He was an elite swimmer and also a member of the BUL Junior's National team excelling in breaststroke. Later he became the president of the board of directors of the Bulgarian Swimming Federation.

As a banker, he was one of the richest men in Bulgaria and throughout the Balkans.  His main business interests were in the frame of banking, insurance and tourism.

Kyulev was shot dead while driving his SUV down Boulevard Bulgaria in Sofia on October 26, 2005.

1957 births
2005 deaths
Bulgarian bankers
Businesspeople from Sofia
Deaths by firearm in Bulgaria
Newspaper publishers (people)
People murdered in Bulgaria
Sportspeople from Sofia
University of National and World Economy alumni
Bulgarian murder victims
2005 murders in Bulgaria